Sword grass may refer to:

Some species of grasses with blades that are sharp enough to cut human skin (this is because they contain many silica phytoliths, a hardening material in many plants. The sharp blades help to discourage herbivores from grazing (also protecting the grasses around it)), including:
Gahnia species
Imperata cylindrica (cogon grass)
Poa ensiformis
Moths and butterflies:
Xylena exsoleta (sword-grass)
Xylena vetusta (red sword-grass)
Tisiphone abeona (sword-grass brown)
Tisiphone helena (northern sword-grass brown)

Animal common name disambiguation pages